Martin Schubert is professor of medieval German at the University of Duisburg-Essen. He is engaged in research into an anonymous Austrian author who translated the Bible into German 200 years before Martin Luther.

References

Living people
Year of birth missing (living people)
Academic staff of the University of Duisburg-Essen
German biblical scholars
German philologists